Megalomacha is a genus of moths belonging to the subfamily Tortricinae of the family Tortricidae.

Species
Megalomacha tigripes Diakonoff, 1960

See also
List of Tortricidae genera

References

External links
tortricidae.com

Tortricidae genera
Olethreutinae
Taxa named by Alexey Diakonoff